Elven Banner is an adventure for fantasy role-playing games published by Mayfair Games in 1985.

Contents
Elven Banner a scenario for character levels 2-4 involving a trip in time to retrieve the lost Elven Banner.  It draws on information in the Elves supplement.

Publication history
Elven Banner was written by Laurel Nicholson, with a cover by Dawn Wilson, and was published by Mayfair Games in 1985 as a 32-page book with a removable cardstock map screen.

Reception

References

Fantasy role-playing game adventures
Role Aids
Role-playing game supplements introduced in 1985